Bette Bourne (born Peter Bourne, 22 September 1939) is a British actor, drag queen, campaigner, and activist. His theatrical career has spanned six decades. He came to prominence in the mid-1970s onwards after joining the New York-based alternative gay cabaret troupe Hot Peaches. He then went on to form his own alternative gay theatrical company, Bloolips.

Early life
Peter Bourne was born in Hackney, East London, into a working-class family. He was one of four children and had two sisters and a brother. His mother was an amateur actress. Bourne made his stage debut at the age of four as a member of Madame Behenna and her Dancing Children performing at Stoke Newington Town Hall where he sang Don't Sit Under The Apple Tree. The first play he remembers seeing was a production of Thornton Wilder’s Our Town in the early 1950s, although he had an interest in acting before that. His father was indifferent to his son's acting aspirations. When Bourne reached 16, he did an apprenticeship as a printmaker, which lasted only three months. He then worked in journalism working at the New Scientist. Bourne began his theatre career working backstage at London's Garrick Theatre. He was not the only member of his family to enter show business, his brother is the actor and singer Mike Berry.

1960s TV and Theatre Work 

Peter studied drama at London's Central School of Speech and Drama in Swiss Cottage and went on to act on stage and on television throughout the 1960s. He appeared in TV series such as The Avengers and The Prisoner, and in 1969, he appeared alongside Sir Ian McKellen in a touring double bill of Christopher Marlowe's Edward II and Shakespeare's Richard II.

The 1970s & 1980s, Hot Peaches, and Bloolips

In the 1970s, feeling disillusioned with show business, Bourne put his acting career on hold to become an activist with the Gay Liberation Front. He became a part of the infamous gay commune based in Colville Terrace in Notting Hill, London. During this seminal period, Bourne started wearing drag and changed his name to 'Bette'.

In 1976, Bourne joined the New York-based gay cabaret troupe Hot Peaches and performed with them across Europe, culminating in a show at the Institute of Contemporary Arts in London. When the troupe returned to New York City, Bourne remained in London and founded his own gay musical comedy company, Bloolips, in which men performed all the roles.

The Birth of Bloolips
Bette's inspiration for founding the company came from "a record he found on one of the junk stalls on Portobello Market of Jean Metcalfe reading (in her very best BBC voice) the story of The Ugly Duckling. It was the perfect Coming Out story, and thus Bloolips was born." The company employed the scriptwriter John Taylor (Jon Jon), who wrote many of the company's productions. Ray Dobbins wrote some of the scripts later on in the troupes career. Satirical political comedy was combined with tap dancing and singing, with the men dressed more clown-like than as female impersonators. The shows drew heavily on the glamour of the 1920s and 1930s golden era of Hollywood and Broadway theatre and were staged, produced, and directed very much in the vaudeville tradition with Bette cast as the leading lady. However, they came with a twist: the scenery and costumes were creatively designed to look tawdry and down-at-heel, to imply the company was on its last legs. Everyone in the troupe made their own costumes on a limited budget "out of plastic laundry baskets, broken lampshades, and tat from second-hand shops, sometimes using mops as wigs."

All the shows featured original songs or adaptations of well-known numbers. One of their most memorable adaptations was of 'We’re in The Money,' (from the movie Gold Diggers of 1933) when clearly, they weren't. Some of their more notable original songs included ‘Let's Scream Our Tits Off,’ ‘I'm Mad About Leisure’, ‘B.A.N.A.N.A.S.,’ ‘I Want to Be Bad,’ and ‘I'd Love to Dance the Tango but My Suit Says No.’ Many of the show's themes and titles were adapted from famous movies: Lust in Space, Gland Hotel, Get Hur, The Ugly Duckling, etc. The sense of humour and comedy portrayed in the shows was very much in the Mel Brooks and Gene Wilder style. It was with Bloolips, Bourne's traditional theatrical training came into its own; his onstage delivery and timing were impeccable. "The first Bloolips rehearsals were done in my flat in Notting Hill, seven of us tap dancing in a line. One afternoon we went downstairs for a coffee, and the ceiling had fallen in," recalled Bette in an interview in The Guardian. Bloolips premiered their first show "at The Tabernacle, Notting Hill in Powis Square in August 1978 and were a sensation." Thereafter, it became a regular practice for the troupe to premiere many of their productions at The Tabernacle, Notting Hill to financially benefit the local community.
 
"Two years later we went to New York and opened in the off-off Broadway Theatre of the New City. We became the darlings of the East Village, moved to the off-Broadway Orpheum Theatre with a run which extended to June 1981 and won the off-Broadway OBIE Award," remembers Bette. Bette vividly recollects his first visit to New York with Bloolips in a ‘Letter from Bette Bourne’ written to the artist Francie Lyshak, in which he recounts the excitement and vibrancy of the city in the early ‘80s and how hospitable the local gay community, and New Yorkers as a whole, were towards them. Lavinia Co-op also gives an account of the same period in an interview with Lyshak. The New York Times critic Mel Gussow lavished praise on Lust in Space and the six Englishmen that performed it. "Bloolips are bizarrely funny. It's not what you do, but how you do it. They tap-dance with clattering precision, harmonize on old sounding tunes and never forget the parodistic nature of their endeavor, imitating everyone from dim-witted ingenues to flamboyant femmes fatales." The Bloolips company toured the UK and Europe throughout the 1980s and 1990s. They enjoyed tremendous success in America, where on several occasions they starred off-Broadway in New York and went on to win two OBIE Awards, including one for their New York production of Lust in Space, where it ran for nine months selling out nightly. A two-month season on the west coast in San Francisco followed their New York City success. "We continued touring Europe the USA and Canada until the last show in 1998."

The original core members of Bloolips were Bette Bourne, Lavinia Co-op, Precious Pearl, Diva Dan, and Gretel Feather. During Bloolips’ existence, there were around 25 different members in the troupe. "We were the original Priscillas, Queens of the Desert, zooming up and down the country in a broken VW van," Lavinia Co-op remembers of his time touring with the troupe. It has since been said that Bloolips brought radical drag to the mainstream. A documentary movie of Bloolips was shot in New York City in 1993 during one of their lengthy seasons performing in the city. The film titled Bloolips contains footage of the troupe performing Get Hur on stage, as well as backstage footage and interviews with the cast.

Bloolips shows
Bloolips performed 13 shows and disbanded in 1998. These included:
 The Ugly Duckling (1978–79)
 Cheek! (1978)
 Vamp and Camp (1979)
 Lust in Space (1980–82)
 Yum Yum (1983)
 Odds 'n Sods (1983–84)
 Sticky Buns (1983–84)
 Living Leg-ends (1985)
 Slung Back and Strapless (1986–87)
 Teenage Trash (1987–88)
 Gland Hotel (1988–90)
 Get Hur (1993)
 The Island of Lost Shoes (1995)

In 1988, Bloolips toured Canada visiting Halifax, Nova Scotia and Ottawa in a Best of Bloolips production.

In 1990, Bourne and Precious Pearl (Paul Shaw) took a break from Bloolips and appeared with Lois Weaver and Peggy Shaw in Belle Reprieve, in which Bourne and Shaw had a hand in writing. The play was produced by Split Britches and performed in London, New York City, San Francisco, Boston, and Seattle. In 1991, the company won a Village Voice OBIE Award for Ensemble Production.

In 1998, Bourne and Paul Shaw visited America with a best of Bloolips production tilted Bloo Revue.

In 2013, Bette and Paul Shaw gave a special retrospective performance titled A Right Pair, charting their journey through show business with monologues and turns from selected productions over the past 40 years.

In June 2019, a 1981 offset lithograph window card advertising Bloolips at the Orpheum Theatre in Lust in Space came up for auction at New York's Swann Galleries and sold for $281.

Mid-1990s Onwards

In 1995, Bourne performed solo in New York City in the production East of Eadie written by Ray Dobbins. Also, in 1995, Bourne won a Manchester Evening News award for his performance as Lady Bracknell in the English Touring Theatre production of Oscar Wilde'sThe Importance of Being Earnest.

In 1996, he appeared in Neil Bartlett and Nick Bloomfield's production of Sarrasine at the Lyric Hammersmith. He worked with Bartlett again at the Lyric Hammersmith in 2003, performing in a production of Shakespeare's Pericles, Prince of Tyre co-starring Will Keen.

In 1999, Bourne played his friend, Quentin Crisp, in Tim Fountain's play, Resident Alien, at London's Bush Theatre. So successful was the production it toured the world and played in New York City and Sydney. At Edinburgh Festival Fringe in 2001, Bourne won a prestigious Herald Award for his portrayal of Crisp. Fountain wrote two more plays for Bourne: H-O-T-B-O-I, which was produced at the Soho Theatre in 2004, and Rock in 2008.

Bourne was part of the Donmar Warehouse production of The Vortex in 2002, for which he won the Clarence Derwent Award. In 2005, he appeared in Read My Hips at London's Drill Hall, playing the gay 20th-century Greek poet Constantine P. Cavafy living in Alexandria.

In 2005, at the Royal National Theatre Bourne was in Improbable Theatre's stage adaptation of the film, Theatre of Blood. For the Royal Shakespeare Company, Bourne played Dogberry in Shakespeare's Much Ado About Nothing at London's Novello Theatre in 2007. Also in 2007, Bourne worked with the playwright Mark Ravenhill on a short play, Ripper, staged at the Union Theatre in London. Bourne played the role of Queen Victoria.

In 2009, Bourne talked about his life in A Life in Three Acts at the Traverse Theatre, Edinburgh, a staged reading of transcripts of conversations with playwright Mark Ravenhill.

In 2010, London's Evening Standard published an article by Mark Ravenhill in which he named Bette Bourne ‘The Queen of London.’

In 2014 Bourne featured in a documentary film about his life and work, It Goes with the Shoes, written and directed by Mark Ravenhill.

Acting credits

Theatre
 Edward II (Edmund of Kent), Edinburgh Festival & West End, 1969
 Richard II, Edinburgh Festival & West End, 1969
 A Vision of Love Revealed in Sleep for Gloria at The Drill Hall, London, 1989–1990 
 The Importance of Being Earnest (Lady Bracknell), 1995
 Sarasine, Lyric Hammersmith, London, 1996
 Resident Alien (Quentin Crisp), Bush Theatre, London, 1999
 The Vortex (Pauncefort Quentin), Donmar Warehouse, London, 2002
 Pericles, Prince of Tyre (Narrator), Lyric Hammersmith, London, 2003
 H-O-T-B-O-I (aka Deep Rimming in Poplar) (Reg), Soho Theatre, London, 2004
 Read My Hips (Constantine P. Cavafy), The Drill Hall, London, 2005
 Theatre of Blood (Michael Merridew), Royal National Theatre, London, 2005
 Ripper (Queen Victoria), Union Theatre, London, 2007
 Much Ado About Nothing (Dogberry), Novello Theatre, London, 2007
 Rock (Henry Willson), Oval House Theatre, London, 2008
 A Life in Three Acts (as himself), Traverse Theatre, Edinburgh, 2009
 A Life in Three Acts (as himself), St. Ann's Warehouse, Brooklyn, 2010
 A Right Pair (as himself), Brighton Festival Fringe, 2012
 Macbeth (Porter), Shakespeare's Globe Theatre, 2013
 The Lightning Child (Tiresias), Shakespeare's Globe Theatre, 2013

Film
 Caught Looking (1991) – Narrator
 A Little Bit of Lippy (1992) – Venus Lamour
 My Summer Vacation (1996) - English interviewee
 Chéri (2009) - Baronne
 Macbeth (2013) - as Porter
 It Goes with the Shoes (2014) - as himself

Television
 Edward II (1970) – Edmund of Kent
 The Avengers (1968) – Preece
 The Prisoner  (1967) – Projection Operator
 The Saint  (1967) – Perry
 The Baron  (1967) – Peter
 The Avengers (1966) – Allen
 Dixon of Dock Green (1965) – Matcham
 Dixon of Dock Green (1964)– Blackie
 Dixon of Dock Green (1963) – Robert

Archives and Further Reading

 A Life in Three Acts by Bette Bourne and Mark Ravenhill, Bloomsbury Publishing, 2010.
 Unfinished Histories Archive – Bette Bourne
 Unfinished Histories Archive – Recording the History of Alternative Theatre
 Meet The Queens - Taylor Mac honours Bloolips, in the 'Queens of 2021' documentary.
 In Pictures: Bloolips and the Empowering Joy of Dressing Up - Exhibition at Platform Southwark, London, celebrates the legacy of the radical drag theatre company.
  Lust In Space - Bill Wolf's tableaux vivant of Lust in Space and the Bloolips troupe during their visit to San Francisco in 1981. The blog exhibits some wonderful photographs of Bloolips, including pictures of Bloolips float in the San Francisco Gay Pride Parade.

Exhibitions

Bloolips and Radical Drag: Making an Exhibition of Ourselves, July 2019. Platform Southwark, London.

References

External links
 
 A short documentary about Bloolips, 1993
 Bette Bourne and Bloolips –  Making an Exhibition of Themselves
 IMDb Film Database: Bette Bourne

1939 births
Living people
Clarence Derwent Award winners
People from Hackney Central
English drag queens
English gay actors
Alumni of the Royal Central School of Speech and Drama
British male stage actors
Notting Hill
English LGBT actors
History of the Royal Borough of Kensington and Chelsea
20th-century English LGBT people
20th-century theatre
Drag groups
21st-century English LGBT people